Acrocercops myriogramma is a moth of the family Gracillariidae, known from Uttarakhand, India. It was described by Edward Meyrick in 1937. The hostplant for the species is Mallotus philippinensis.

References

myriogramma
Moths of Asia
Moths described in 1937